Dennis Sydney Viollet (20 September 1933 – 6 March 1999) was an English footballer who played for Manchester United and Stoke City as well as the England national team. He was famous as one of the Busby Babes and survived the Munich air disaster. After his retirement as player, he became a coach and spent most of his managerial career in the United States for various professional and school teams.

Club career

Manchester United

Viollet joined Manchester United on 1 September 1949. He came through the junior ranks at United and turned professional in 1950. His first game for the club came against Newcastle United on 11 April 1953. One of his most notable games came on 26 September 1956, in the second leg of United's European Cup preliminary round tie against Belgian champions Anderlecht, in which he scored four goals in a 10–0 win that remains United's biggest competitive victory. In February 1958, Viollet was flying back from a European Cup match in Belgrade via Munich; attempting to take off in bad weather, the plane crashed, killing 21 people, including seven Manchester United players, in what would become known as the Munich air disaster. Viollet survived, suffering only injuries to his head and face, and he returned to action before the end of the season, less than three months later. He played in the 1958 FA Cup Final against Bolton Wanderers, which United lost 2–0, and less than a week later, he scored the equalising goal in a 2–1 win over Milan in the first leg of their European Cup semi-final; Milan won the second leg 4–0 to deny United a place in the final.

After scoring 21 goals in 37 league appearances in 1958–59, Viollet had his most prolific season to date in 1959–60, scoring 32 goals in 36 league appearances, a club record. In recognition of his scoring exploits, Viollet received his first call-up to the England team in May 1960; after being left out for a 3–3 home draw with Yugoslavia and a 3–0 away defeat to Spain on 15 May, he was named at inside left for a 2–0 away defeat to Hungary a week later. Despite missing three months of the 1960–61 season, he still scored 15 goals, behind only Bobby Charlton and Alex Dawson as Manchester United's top scorer, and in September 1961, he was called up to the England squad again for a 1962 World Cup qualifier at home to Luxembourg; Viollet scored England's second goal in a 4–1 win. In January 1962, Matt Busby surprisingly sold the 28-year-old Viollet to Stoke City for £25,000 after scoring 179 goals in 293 appearances for United.

Stoke City
He joined a team being re-built by Tony Waddington, containing experienced players such as Stanley Matthews, and Jackie Mudie and also emerging talent such as John Ritchie and Eric Skeels. His signing was viewed as a coup for Stoke as at 28 Viollet was still in his prime]]. He made a decent start to his Stoke career scoring five goals towards the end of the 1961–62 season meaning that hopes were high for 1962–63. While six games without a win heralded another poor start for Stoke, Viollet kick-started Stoke's season with four goals against Charlton Athletic on 12 September. That win gave Stoke the impetus to embark on an unbeaten run of 18, ended by Leeds United on 15 December. The winter of 1962–63 saw no matches played for two months and once football resumed in March Stoke lost once in their next 13 matches and won the Second Division title with Viollet scoring 23 goals. With Stoke back in the First Division after a ten-year absence Waddington decided to move Viollet into midfield. He played and scored in the 1964 Football League Cup Final as Stoke lost 4–3 to Leicester City. He continued to play for Stoke until the summer of 1967 when he announced his retirement after scoring 66 goals in 207 matches for the "Potters". Shortly after his death in March 1999 he was honoured by the club having a street near the Britannia Stadium named 'Dennis Viollet Avenue'.

Later career
Shortly after leaving the Victoria Ground, he came out of retirement to join NASL team Baltimore Bays in the United States for a season. On returning to Britain, he played for non-league Witton Albion, before finishing his career at Linfield helping them to win the Irish cup in 1970. Once his playing career finished, he had spells coaching at Preston North End, and Crewe Alexandra briefly in 1971.

Coaching career in the United States
In 1974, Dennis Viollet became the first Head Coach for the Washington Diplomats of the NASL. In 1978, Viollet was selected by his former United teammate, head coach Noel Cantwell, to serve as assistant coach of the New England Tea Men of the North American Soccer League. After three seasons in the Boston area, the team relocated to Jacksonville, Florida in 1981 where Viollet continued as assistant coach, ultimately becoming head coach, of the Jacksonville Tea Men of the NASL, ASL and United Soccer League. The Team Men won the ASL, bringing the City of Jacksonville its first ever professional sports championship. Viollet in 1985 coached the varsity boys soccer team at St. Johns Country Day School located in Orange Park, Florida. He also coached the Jacksonville Knights, a professional indoor soccer team, in 1989. In 1990, Viollet took the reins of the Jacksonville University Dolphins, where he stayed until 1995. Jacksonville University and their primary rivals, the University of North Florida, compete annually for the Dennis Viollet Cup. He then took the USISL Richmond Kickers to the 1995 American Double (USISL Premier League and US Open Cup titles). He stayed with Richmond for 2 seasons, then served as coach of the A-League Jacksonville Cyclones before his death from cancer on 6 March 1999, aged 65, in his adopted home of Jacksonville.

International career
On 22 May 1960, at the end of his record-breaking season with Manchester United, Viollet won his first full England cap in a 2–0 friendly defeat to Hungary in Budapest. His second and final appearance came on 28 September 1961, in a qualifying game for the 1962 World Cup at Highbury, in which he scored in a 4–1 win over Luxembourg.

Personal life
Viollet was born in Fallowfield, Manchester, in September 1933, the youngest of three children born to Charles Sydney Viollet (1890–1961) and Hannah Tomlinson (1893–1992); he had two older sisters, Vera (born 1917) and Audrey (born 1930). He grew up as a Manchester City supporter.

He married Barbara Mavis Southern at St Edmund's Church, Manchester, in 1951, when he was 17 years old. Their daughter Stephanie was born later that year, and they later had two sons, Roger (born 1957) and Malcolm (born 1961), and another daughter, Deborah (born 1958). They divorced in 1969, and in June that year, Viollet married Helen B. Greeph; they were married until his death nearly 30 years later. Their daughter Rachel (born 1972) became the British number one ranked tennis player when she reached the second round of Wimbledon in 1996. During her tennis career, she won one ITF singles tournament and one ITF doubles tournament.

Viollet died in March 1999 after a two-year battle against cancer, with a brain tumour first being diagnosed during 1997, despite treatment and surgery during that time to combat the illness.

In 2010, Viollet was inducted into the Washington, D.C. Soccer Hall of Fame. Viollet was also inducted into the first class of the United Soccer League Hall of Fame in 2002. The annual University of North Florida/Jacksonville University soccer match has been contested for the Viollet Cup since 2001. The Dennis Viollet Soccer Training Center was dedicated in 2006 and located at the Complete Soccer Academy in Longwood, Florida.

Career statistics

Club
Source:

A.  The "Other" column constitutes appearances and goals in the FA Charity Shield.

International
Source:

Managerial career

Honours

Manchester United
Football League First Division: 1955–56, 1956–57
FA Charity Shield: 1956, 1957

Stoke City
Football League Second Division: 1962–63

Linfield
Irish Cup: 1969–70

Individual
European Cup Top Scorer: 1956–57
Football League First Division Top Scorer: 1959–60

References

External links
 Dennis Viollet official site
 Dennis Viollet Documentary 

American Soccer League (1933–1983) coaches
Baltimore Bays players
Crewe Alexandra F.C. managers
English footballers
English football managers
England international footballers
Linfield F.C. players
Manchester United F.C. players
National Professional Soccer League (1967) players
College men's soccer coaches in the United States
North American Soccer League (1968–1984) players
Footballers from Manchester
Survivors of aviation accidents or incidents
Stoke City F.C. players
English Football League players
First Division/Premier League top scorers
United Soccer League (1984–85) coaches
USISL coaches
USL First Division coaches
North American Soccer League (1968–1984) coaches
Witton Albion F.C. players
1933 births
1999 deaths
English Football League managers
Jacksonville Dolphins coaches
English Football League representative players
People from Fallowfield
Association football forwards
Richmond Kickers coaches
English expatriate sportspeople in the United States
Expatriate soccer players in the United States
English expatriate footballers
English expatriate football managers
Expatriate soccer managers in the United States
Washington Diplomats
FA Cup Final players
UEFA Champions League top scorers